The men' teams classification diving event at the 2019 Summer Universiade was contested between 2 and 8 July 2019 at the Mostra d'Oltremare in Naples, Italy.

Results

References 

Diving at the 2019 Summer Universiade